Josep Maria Guzmán Cañas (born February 28, 1984 in Badalona, Catalonia) is a Spanish basketball player, playing the point guard position.

Clubs 
 Joventut Badalona - EBA (Spain) - 2001/2002
 Joventut Badalona - EBA & ACB (Spain) - 2002/2004
 Melilla Baloncesto - LEB (Spain) - 2004/2005
 CB Prat - EBA (Spain) - 2004/2005
 CB Tarragona - LEB (Spain) - 2005/2007
 ViveMenorca - ACB (Spain) - 2007/2010
 CE Lleida Bàsquet - LEB (Spain) - 2010/present

External links

ACB Profile

1984 births
Living people
Basketball players from Catalonia
Spanish men's basketball players
Liga ACB players
Joventut Badalona players
Melilla Baloncesto players
Menorca Bàsquet players
CB Tarragona players
CB Prat players
Point guards